This is a list of episodes for original Japanese anime series, Ghost Slayers Ayashi. It is known as Tenpō Ibun Ayakashi Ayashi in Japan.

The series is created and animated by BONES, written by Shō Aikawa and had character designs done by Toshihiro Kawamoto. Directed by Hiroshi Nishikiori.

Ghost Slayers Ayashi was originally released in 3 parts, with each part having 2 DVDs. Part 1 has Volumes 1 (Episodes 1-5) & 2 (Episodes 6-10), which was released on December 2, 2008. Part 2 has Volumes 3 (Episodes 11-15) & 4 (Episodes 16-20) and was released April 7, 2009. Part 3 has Volumes 5 (Episodes 21-25) & 6 (OVAs 1-5) and was released on July 7, 2009. A Complete Collection was released on July 6, 2010. All DVDs are distributed by Bandai Entertainment.
 
In March 2011, Animax Asia aired and English dubbed version of the first 24 episodes.

Episode list

OVA episodes

The series spans five episodes in all.

Notes and references

Ghost Slayers Ayashi